Emily Susan Hartwell (Pinyin: Xià Yǒngměi; Foochow Romanized: Hâ Īng-mī; April 16, 1859 – October 2, 1951) was a Congregational Christian educational missionary and philanthropist in Foochow, China under the American Board of Foreign Missions.

Life
Miss Emily S. Hartwell was the daughter of Lucy E. Stearns and Charles Hartwell, who were the pioneering Congregational missionaries stationed in Foochow. She graduated from Wheaton College in 1883 and taught there before her mother died in Foochow and she returned as a missionary.

She started a girls' school at Ponasang and for 20 years she taught English at Foochow College. When Foochow was inundated by a flood in 1900 Miss Hartwell organized relief work. She also founded an orphanage named the Christian Herald Fukien Industrial Homes at Ado. After the fall of the Qing Dynasty in 1911 she raised funds to aid the stranded and starving Manchus in Foochow. Other charitable institutions established by her included the Union Kindergarten Training School, the Christian Women's Industrial Institute, and the Dr. Cordelia A. Green Memorial Home.

Miss Hartwell received the Order of Golden Grain from the president of the Fukian Provincial Government. She was evacuated from Foochow in 1937 during the Sino-Japanese War, and died in Oberlin, Ohio in 1951.

References

1859 births
1951 deaths
Congregationalist missionaries in China
Christian missionaries in Fujian
Wheaton College (Massachusetts) alumni
American expatriates in China
American Congregationalist missionaries
Female Christian missionaries